Gene Oliver was a college football player for the South Carolina Gamecocks. A running back and captain of the 1904 team, he played an entire game against Georgia with a broken jaw. Oliver also made All-Southern.

References 

All-Southern college football players
South Carolina Gamecocks football players
American football halfbacks